Kahrabaa Al-Hartha Sport Club, is an Iraqi football team based in Al-Hartha, Basra, that plays in Iraq Division Two.

Managerial history

  Alaa Dar'am

Famous players
Ammar Abdul-Hussein

See also
 2000–01 Iraqi Elite League
 2002–03 Iraq FA Cup
 2021–22 Iraq FA Cup

References

External links
 Kahrabaa Al-Hartha SC on Goalzz.com
 Iraq Clubs- Foundation Dates
 Basra Clubs Union

Football clubs in Iraq
1994 establishments in Iraq
Association football clubs established in 1994
Football clubs in Basra
Basra